Nationality words link to articles with information on the nation's poetry or literature (for instance, Irish or France).

Events
 February 24 – Première of first stage production of the poetic drama Peer Gynt by Henrik Ibsen (published 1867) with incidental music by Edvard Grieg, in Christiania, Norway.

Works published in English

United Kingdom
 Robert Bridges, The Growth of Love (revised and expanded in 1889)
 Robert Browning, Pacchiarotto and How He Worked in Distemper; with Other Poems
 Lewis Carroll, The Hunting of the Snark
 Edward Dowden, Poems
 Toru Dutt, A Sheaf Gleaned in French Fields: Verse Translations and Poems, Bhowanipur, Calcutta: B. M. Bose (expanded edition, Bhowanipur: Saptahik Sambad Press 1878; London: Kegan Paul 1880); Indian poet, writing in English, published in the United Kingdom
 Dora Greenwell, Camera Obscura
 Gerard Manley Hopkins, The Wreck of the Deutschland, submitted for publication but not in fact published until 1918
 Edward Lear, Laughable Lyrics: Fourth Book of Nonsense Poems, Songs, Botany, Music, &c., including "The Dong with a Luminous Nose", "The Courtship of the Yonghy-Bonghy-Bò", "The Pobble Who Has No Toes", "The Quangle Wangle's Hat" and "The Akond of Swat", published December 1876, dated 1877
 William Morris, The Story of Sigurd the Volsung and the Fall of the Niblungs
 Emily Pfeiffer, Poems
 Percy Bysshe Shelley, The Works of Percy Bysshe Shelley, edited by Harry Buxton Forman, eight volumes published from this year through 1880

United States
 Ralph Waldo Emerson, Selected Poems
 Herman Melville, Clarel: A Poem and Pilgrimage in the Holy Land
 Julia A. Moore, The Sweet Singer of Michigan Salutes the Public (see subsection below; republished as The Sentimental Song Book)
 Bayard Taylor, The Echo Club and Other Literary Diversions
 Walt Whitman, Leaves of Grass, sixth edition
 John Greenleaf Whittier, Mabel Martin

The Sweet Singer of Michigan Salutes the Public

This year Poetaster Julia A. Moore's first book of verse, The Sentimental Song Book, was published in Grand Rapids, and  quickly went into a second printing. A copy fell into the hands of one James F. Ryder, a Cleveland, Ohio, publisher who recognized its awful majesty and soon republished it under the title The Sweet Singer of Michigan Salutes the Public. Ryder sent out numerous review copies to newspapers across the country, with a cover letter filled with low key mock praise.

And so Moore received national attention. Following Ryder's lead, contemporary reviews were amusedly negative.  For instance, The Rochester Democrat wrote of Sweet Singer, that "Shakespeare, could he read it, would be glad that he was dead …. If Julia A. Moore would kindly deign to shed some of her poetry on our humble grave, we should be but too glad to go out and shoot ourselves tomorrow."

Other in English
 Toru Dutt, A Sheaf Gleaned in French Fields: Verse Translations and Poems, Bhowanipur, Calcutta: B. M. Bose (expanded edition, Bhowanipur: Saptahik Sambad Press 1878; London: Kegan Paul 1880); Indian poet, writing in English, published in the United Kingdom
 Behramji Merwanji Malabari, editor, The Indian Muse in English Garb, Bombay: Merwanji Nowroji, Daboo, 99 pages; Indian poetry in English

Works published in other languages

France
 François Coppée, Olivier
 Stéphane Mallarmé, L'après-midi d'un faune ("Afternoon of a Faun", or "A Faun in the Afternoon"), published in April, with illustrations by Manet
 Catulle Mendès, Poesies, jere serie

Spanish
  Rosario de Acuña, Ecos del alma ("Echoes from the Soul")

Births
Death years link to the corresponding "[year] in poetry" article:
 January 19 – Dragotin Kette (died 1899), Slovene
 January 25 – William Ellery Leonard (died 1944), American
 January 30 – Eva Dobell (died 1963) English poet, nurse, and editor best known for her verses related to World War I soldiers
 February 4 – Sarah Norcliffe Cleghorn (died 1959), American poet and socialist
 February 6 – Alice Guerin Crist (died 1941), Irish-born Australian
 March 4 – Léon-Paul Fargue (died 1947), French editor, poet and essayist
 March 15 – Kambara Ariake 蒲原有明  pen-name of Kambara Hayao (died 1952), Japanese Taishō and Shōwa period poet and novelist
 June 20 – Edmond Laforest (suicide 1915), Haitian French language poet
 July 12 – Max Jacob (died 1944), French painter, poet and critic
 July 25 – Mihai Codreanu (died 1957), Romanian
 September 7 – C. J. Dennis (died 1938), Australian poet, author of The Songs of a Sentimental Bloke
 October 4 – Hugh McCrae (died 1958), Australian
 December 9 – Mizuho Ōta 太田水穂  pen-name of "Teiichi Ōta" 太田 貞, occasionally also using the pen name, "Mizuhonoya" (died 1955), Japanese Shōwa period poet and literary scholar
 Also:
 William Lawson (died 1957), Australian
 Joseph Lee (died 1949), Scottish war poet, artist and journalist
 Saishū Onoe 尾上柴舟 (died 1957), Japanese tanka poet and calligrapher

Deaths
Birth years link to the corresponding "[year] in poetry" article:
 June 20 – John Neal (born 1793), eccentric and influential American writer, critic, lecturer, and activist
 July 14 – Charles Heavysege (born 1816), Canadian
 December 23 – Charles Neaves (born 1800), Scottish judge and poet
 December 27 – Frederik Paludan-Muller (born 1809), Danish
 December 30 – Christian Winther (born 1796), Danish
 Also:
 Gu Taiqing (born 1799), Chinese poet during the Qing Dynasty
 Maqbool Shah Kralawari (born 1820), Indian, Kashmiri-language poet
 Meenakshi Sundaram Pillai (born 1815), Indian Tamil scholar and poet

See also

 19th century in poetry
 19th century in literature
 List of years in poetry
 List of years in literature
 Victorian literature
 French literature of the 19th century
 Poetry

Notes

19th-century poetry
Poetry